The Gardener (Italian - L'ortolano), The Vegetable Gardener or Vegetables in a Bowl is a 1587–1590 oil on panel painting by Giuseppe Arcimboldo, now in the Museo Civico Ala Ponzone in Cremona, Italy. One way up it shows a bowl of vegetables - the other way up it shows a human face by pareidolia. The face includes several suggestions of the male and female genitalia, meaning that it can be interpreted as Priapus, the ithyphallic pagan god of fertility and protector of gardens. The same painter also produced The Fruit Basket and The Cook.

Paintings by Giuseppe Arcimboldo
1590 paintings